Pancha Sabhai Sthalangal refers to the temples of Nataraja, a form of the Hindu god Shiva where he performed the Cosmic Dance Tandava.  Pancha indicates Five, Sabhai means hall and Stala means place.  All these temples are located in Tamil Nadu, India. The five dance performances were Kali Tandava at Rathinachabai in Vada Aaranyeswarar Temple, Ananda Tandava at Porchabai in Natarajar Temple, Sandhya Tandava at Vellichabai in Meenakshi Amman Temple, Muni Tandava at Thamirachabai at Nellaiappar Temple and Tripura Tandava at Chithirachabai in Kutralanathar Temple. 

The presiding deities are revered in the 7th century Tamil Saiva canonical work, the Tevaram, written by Tamil saint poets known as the nayanars and classified as Paadal Petra Sthalam. The four temples in Tamil Nadu are maintained and administered by the Hindu Religious and Charitable Endowments Department of the Government of Tamil Nadu.

Nataraja
The five places where Shiva performed cosmic dance are called Pancha sabhai Thalangal. There are five Sabhas within Chidambaram temple itself. Those are called Chitra sabhai (the sanctum), Porsabhai (hall preceding the sanctum), Nirutha Sabhai (the chariot shaped hall), Deva Sabhai (the hall where all the festival deities are housed) and Rajasabhai (the thousand pillared hall).

As per Bharata Muni, Shiva is the originator of dance and he allowed Nandi to witness his performance. Tandava, the dance form, is derived from Tanda, the other name of Nandi. Shiva Tandava is classified into seven types, namely, Kali Tandava, Sandhya Tandava, Tripura Tandava, Anandha Tandava, Uma Tandava, Samhara Tandavaand Urdhwa Tandava.

A few temples in Tamil Nadu are closely associated with Nataraja and have their own myths of dance along with the halls specific to their version of dance.  The seven dances of Shiva can be recognised as the varied facts of single theme viz. the Beauty and Bliss of the Absolute.  Herein lies the aesthetic fact of the dance.  

In the above classification of Shiva's dance, as mentioned in puranic literature the temples are found within the geographical and cultural limit of Tamil Nadu.  Of the seven dances, the seventh dance, Ananda Thandava is representative and symbolic of the themes inherent in all other dances.  The seventh is a composite ideal of the main tenets of Saiva Siddhanta Philosophy.  The dance itself is a source of supreme aesthetic enjoyment of the beauty and bliss of god

The Five Temples

Notes

Reference

External
Pancha Sabhai Map